Greif (German for Griffin) may refer to:

 Greif (surname)
 Greif, Inc., a Fortune 1000 company
 Operation Greif, a German infiltration operation using English-speaking troops during the Battle of the Bulge
 Heinkel He 177 Grief, a German heavy bomber during World War II
 Torgelower SV Greif a German football team
 Greif (brigantine)
 SMS Greif, a German light cruiser 
 SMS Greif (auxiliary cruiser), a converted freighter serving as a merchant raider with Imperial Germany in World War I
 German torpedo boat Greif, 1925–1944
 Greif was the name of Erwin Rommel's command vehicle, an Sd.Kfz. 250/3 during his command of the Afrika Korps during World War II
 Badener Greifs, an American football team from Karlsruhe, Germany

See also 
 Greiff (disambiguation)
 Griffin
 Grief